Mooneyham is a surname. Notable people with the surname include:

Bill Mooneyham (born 1960), American baseball player
Walter Stanley Mooneyham (1926–1991), American magazine editor

Fictional characters:
Zack Mooneyham, character in the film School of Rock